"Ayo!" is a song by American singer Mýa. It was written and composed by Mýa, DJ Kool and Christopher “Deep” Henderson and initially recorded for her fourth studio album Liberation (2007). Production on the track was helmed by Henderson, while Kool is having featured vocals. The song is built upon on an of interpolation from the composition "He's the Wizard" by American jazz singer Thelma Carpenter. Due to the inclusion of the sample, Charlie Smalls is also credited as a songwriter. 

The song was expected to be released as the first single from Mýa's fourth studio album Liberation (2007). With the singer was going through transitioning from former label Interscope to her Universal Motown Records though, "Ayo!" was later demoted and replaced by Scott Storch-produced "Lock U Down," a collaboration with rapper Lil Wayne, as the album's leading single.  Critics compared the song's production favorably to TLC’s 1990s album CrazySexyCool. On the charts, it "Ayo!" became a minor hit on Billboards Hot R&B/Hip-Hop Songs chart, peaking at number seventy.

Background
“Ayo!” was originally recorded by girl group 3LW, but was then passed to Mýa. The song was leaked in July 2006, unbeknownst if Universal Motown had chosen the song as the first single taken from the singer's next studio album Liberation. A few days later, online publication Rap-Up confirmed "Ayo!" as the first official single from the album'. Though the song was intended to be the first single from the project, Universal Motown eventually scrapped the single and delayed the album's release. Co-written by Mýa and produced by Chris "Deep" Henderson, the Go-go inspired track samples an interpolation from "He's the Wizard" by American singer Thelma Carpenter from the soundtrack to The Wiz, an adaptation of L. Frank Baum's The Wonderful Wizard of Oz which features an entire African American cast. "He's the Wizard" was originally written by Charlie Smalls for the musical and film, so therefore he is credited for the sample recording.

Critical reception
Billboard magazine gave the song a positive review, writing, "Mýa has become the new captain of sexy, single ladies as she struts her way back into the spotlight. New single, "Ayo!" (pronounced "ee-yo"), featuring hip-hop veteran DJ Kool, is a party anthem that finds the sultry singer just "tryin' to enjoy herself," while hating on the men who can't keep her interest, satisfy or keep it real day-to-da. From the start, the beat takes charge, complemented by loud brassy horns and tight percussion; the hook is fresh, catchy and simplistic. "Ayo!" brings back a bit of old school, reminiscent of TLC's classic 1990s "CrazySexyCool," and leads independent women straight to the doors of the party. Look for her fourth full-length set, "Liberation" Nov. 14."

Track listing

Credits and personnel
Credits lifted from the liner notes of "Ayo!."

 

John Bowman, Jr. – writer
Ralph Cacciurri – recording engineer
Rick DeVarona – recording assistance
Seth Foster – mastering engineer
Serban Ghenea – mixing engineer
Suha Gur – mastering engineer
 
John Hanes – Pro Tools
Mýa Harrison – vocalist, writer
Christopger "Deep" Henderson – producer, writer
Charlie Smalls – writer (sample)
Tim Roberts – mixing assistance

Charts

Weekly charts

Year-end charts

Release history

References

2006 singles
Mýa songs
Go-go songs
Songs written by Charlie Smalls
Songs written by Mýa